Ariany is a small municipality on Majorca, one of the Balearic Islands, Spain. It has an area of 22.72 km ² with 839 inhabitants in 2008,  763 of which lived in the main town.  In 2006, the foreign population of the municipality was 10.4% (80 people).

History
Archeological findings show that the surrounding villages were present in prehistoric times. James I of Aragon first referred to the settlement with its current name. From the sixteenth century it was subject to the Cotoner family, owners of the land in Ariany. The current population center was developed around the manor house of the Auberg's, named S'Auberg i El Camí de Sa Marquesa.
Other main buildings today include the Parish Church of Nuestra Señora de Atocha (built in 1570) and Ca ses Monges, the convent of Franciscan nuns.

References

Ariany
Populated places in Mallorca